Pholadomya is a genus of saltwater clams, marine bivalve molluscs in the family Pholadomyidae.

Fossils species within this genus lived during the Mesozoic era, in the opening South Atlantic, between present-day Brazil and Africa. In the Triassic of Argentina, Austria, Hungary and Italy fossils have been found. They are found in the Jurassic of the Coquina Group, La Guajira, Colombia among many other places. Of Campanian age, this genus is widespread as a fossil in Cameroon, France, Poland, Austria, Germany and the United States. Fossils up to the Neogene have been found in Belgium, the United Kingdom, and Venezuela (Pliocene Mare and Playa Grande Formations) and Miocene Bulgaria, Chile, Colombia, Cyprus, Germany, India, Japan, Malta, Moldova, New Zealand, Panama, Poland, Russia, Slovakia, Trinidad and Tobago and Venezuela. Today, only a single species, P. candida from the Caribbean is known to be extant.

Species 
Species within the genus Pholadomya include:
 Pholadomya candida Sowerby, 1823
 Pholadomya maoria Dell, 1963
 Pholadomya scutata
 Pholadomya tumida
 Pholadomya triquetra
 Pholadomya texta

References

External links 
 WoRMS
 Encyclopaedia of Life
 GBIF
 Natalia Pereira Benaim & Maria Célia Elias Senra Gênero Pholadomya Sowerby, 1823 (Mollusca: Bivalvia) na Formação Jandaíra (Cretáceo Superior)

 
Mesozoic animals of Africa
Mesozoic animals of Asia
Mesozoic animals of Europe
Mesozoic animals of North America
Mesozoic animals of South America
Triassic Argentina
Jurassic Colombia
Paleogene animals of Asia
Paleogene animals of Europe
Paleogene animals of North America
Neogene animals of Europe
Neogene animals of South America
Neogene Chile
Neogene Colombia
Neogene Venezuela
Early Triassic first appearances
Pliocene extinctions
Fossil taxa described in 1823
Bivalve genera